A. montanus  may refer to:

Acanthus montanus, or mountain thistle
Adaina montanus, a moth
Aenetus montanus, a moth
Agapetus montanus, a caddisfly
Alsodes montanus, a frog
Anthodiscus montanus, a plant of the family Caryocaraceae
Araeococcus montanus, a synonym of Pseudaraeococcus montanus, a plant of the family Bromeliaceae
Astylosternus montanus, a frog

See also
 Montanus (disambiguation)